The 1922–23 NCAA season was the third season of official NCAA sponsorship of team and individual national championships for college athletics in the United States, coinciding with the 1922–23 collegiate academic school year.

Only one sport was sponsored: men's track and field.

Before the introduction of the separate University and College Divisions during the 1955–56 school year, the NCAA only conducted a single national championship for each sport. Women's sports were not added until 1981–82.

Championships

Season results

Team titles, by university

Cumulative results

Team titles, by university

References

1922 in American sports
1923 in American sports